One is Bonnie Pink's tenth studio album released under the Warner Music Japan label on May 13, 2009. This album was recorded in London, Stockholm, Los Angeles, Malmö, and Tokyo.

Track listing

2009 albums
Albums recorded at Billboard Live Tokyo
Bonnie Pink albums
Warner Music Japan albums